The 1973 E3 Harelbeke was the 16th edition of the E3 Harelbeke cycle race and was held on 24 March 1973. The race started and finished in Harelbeke. The race was won by Willy In 't Ven.

General classification

References

1973 in Belgian sport
1973
1973 in road cycling